Microporellus obovatus is a species of poroid fungus in the family Polyporaceae. It has been found in French Guiana, Guadeloupe, various locales in Africa, India, and the United States.

References

obovatus
Fungi described in 1838
Fungi of Africa
Fungi of India
Fungi of the United States
Fungi without expected TNC conservation status